Mikrolithos is a village in the municipality of Tyrnavos. Before the 2011 local government reform it was a part of the municipality of Ampelonas. The 2011 census recorded 25 inhabitants in the village. Mikrolithos is a part of the community of Vryotopos.

Population
According to the 2011 census, the population of the settlement of Mikrolithos was 25 people, a decrease of almost 48% compared with the population of the previous census of 2001.

See also
 List of settlements in the Larissa regional unit

References

Populated places in Larissa (regional unit)
Tyrnavos